40 mil från Stureplan is a studio album by Larz-Kristerz. The release party was held inside Älvdalen's sportshall on 4 November 2014, and the album was released on 6 November 2014.

Track listing
"Jag måste glömma Carina"
"Torkade rosor och  brev"
"Kan jag få lov"
"Fast i ditt garn igen"
"Varför vill du inte ha mig?"
"Din för evigt"
"Då kommer jag tillbaka"
"Fröken rar"
"Stoppa i fickan"
"Vykort från himlen"
"Hej gamla väg"
"Kejsarens nya kläder"
"Den riktigt sanna kärleken"
"Pretend"

Personnel
Peter Larsson – vocals, guitar
Trond Korsmoe – bass, choir 
Mikael Eriksson – drums, ocarina
Torbjörn Eriksson – keyboard, accordion
Anders Tegnér – electric guitar

Charts

Weekly charts

Year-end charts

References 

2014 albums
Larz-Kristerz albums